The Howland Research Forest is a  tract of mature evergreen forest in the North Maine Woods, within Penobscot County, central Maine. It is located west of the town of Howland.

History
The tract is part of the 1.1 million acres (4,500 km2) of Maine forest sold in 2005 by International Paper (IP) to the Seven Islands Land Company, a private forest investment management holding company. In 2007, the research forest was purchased by Northeast Wilderness Trust ensuring its wild and natural state into the future.

The Howland Forest is a founding member of the AmeriFlux and FLUXNET research networks.

Ecology
The Howland Forest study site is located in a boreal transitional forest of the New England/Acadian forests ecoregion. The forest is dominated by mixed spruce, hemlock, aspen, and birch stands ranging in age from 45 to 130 years. The soils are formed on coarse-loamy granitic basal till.

Research forest
The tract had previously been designated as a research forest under IP's ownership, attracting researchers from the US Forest Service, the University of Maine, NASA, NOAA, and the Woods Hole Research Center. Areas of study included acid rain, nutrient cycling, soil ecology, and more recently, forest carbon uptake and loss. The forest has one of the longest records of carbon flux measurement in the world, dating to 1996, providing important information about carbon sequestration in mature forests.

References

External links
 

Forests of Maine
North Maine Woods
Research forests
Protected areas of Penobscot County, Maine